Laois GAA clubs contest Gaelic football and hurling competitions. There are both leagues and championships. From senior to under-age level.

Hurling

Senior Hurling Championship
The Laois Senior Hurling Championship is the top level hurling competition in Laois.

Intermediate Hurling Championship
The Laois Intermediate Hurling Championship is the second level hurling competition in Laois.

Junior Hurling Championship
The Laois Junior Hurling Championships are the hurling competitions below second level in Laois.
The Laois Junior A Hurling Championship is the third level hurling competition in Laois.
The Laois Junior B Hurling Championship is the fourth level hurling competition in Laois.
The Laois Junior C Hurling Championship is the fifth level hurling competition in Laois.

Under-21 Hurling Championship
The Laois Under 21 Hurling Championship is the highest level competition for under-21s.

Minor Hurling Championship
The Laois Minor Hurling Championship is the highest level competition for under-18s.

League
The Laois All-County Hurling League

Football

Senior Football Championships
The Laois Senior Football Championship is the top level football competition in Laois.

Intermediate Football Championship
The Laois Intermediate Football Championship is the second level football competition in Laois.

Junior Football Championship
The Laois Junior Football Championships are the football competitions below second level in Laois.
The Laois Junior A Football Championship is the third level football competition in Laois.
The Laois Junior B Football Championship is the fourth level football competition in Laois.
The Laois Junior C Football Championship is the fifth level football competition in Laois.

Under-21 Football Championship
The Laois Under 21 Football Championship is the highest level competition for under-21s.

Minor Football Championship
The Laois Minor Football Championship is the highest level competition for under-18s.

League
The Laois All-County Football League

References

Laois GAA club championships